Pará, usually known as San Luis, is a district of the Santo Domingo canton, in the Heredia province of Costa Rica.

History 
Pará was created on 10 December 1971 by Decreto Ejecutivo 2100-G. Segregated from San Miguel.

Geography 
Pará has an area of  km² and an elevation of  metres.

Demographics 

For the 2011 census, Pará had a population of  inhabitants.

Transportation

Road transportation 
The district is covered by the following road routes:
 National Route 32
 National Route 220
 National Route 308
 National Route 504

References 

Districts of Heredia Province
Populated places in Heredia Province